Black Star or Blackstar may refer to:

Astronomy
Black star (semiclassical gravity), a theoretical star built using semiclassical gravity as an alternative to a black hole
Saturn, referred to as "Black Star" in ancient Judaeic belief

Literature
Blackstar (novel), a 2013 novel by Josh Viola, based on the album Wish Upon a Blackstar by Celldweller
Blackstar, a character from Erin Hunter's Warriors series
The Black Star, a fantasy novel by Lin Carter
Black Star, a character in pulp fiction written by Johnston McCulley
Black Star, a 2018 novel by the Canadian author Maureen Medved

Companies and brands
Black Star (cider), a brand of cider produced by Brookfield Drinks
Black Star (fragrance), a perfume by Avril Lavigne
Black Star (photo agency), a New York-based photo agency founded in 1935
Black Star Canyon, an area in Orange County California
Black Star Line, a shipping line created by Marcus Garvey to repatriate African-Americans to Africa
Black Sex Link, or Black Star, a breed of chicken

Film and television
The Black Star (film), a 1922 German silent film
Blackstar (Arrow), a character in the series Arrow
Blackstar (TV series), a 1981 fantasy/science fiction cartoon by Filmation
Black Star (Soul Eater), a ninja assassin character in Soul Eater media
Black Stars, a set of characters from Sgt. Frog
Black Star, working title of the 1960 western Flaming Star
"Black Star", an episode of the series Space: 1999

Military
Blackstar (spacecraft), a rumored United States Air Force spaceplane
 Black Star, or Type 54 pistol, Chinese pistols

Music
Blackstar Amplification, a UK-based manufacturer of guitar amplification and effects pedals

Bands
Black Star (rap duo), a hip hop group formed by rappers Yasiin Bey and Talib Kweli
Blackstar (band), a heavy metal band formed by former members of Carcass
Black Star, later named Motör Militia, a Bahraini thrash metal band
One of the aliases of jungle producer Rebel MC

Albums
Blackstar (album), a 2016 album by David Bowie
Black Stars (album), a 2001 album by Jason Moran
Mos Def & Talib Kweli Are Black Star, a 1998 album by Black Star
Blackstar, a 2003 album by Yahzarah
Black Star, a 2006 album by Timati

Songs
"Blackstar" (song), a 2015 song by David Bowie
"Black Star", a song by Elvis Presley from sessions for the film Flaming Star
"Black Star", a 1980 song by Touch (1980s band)
"Black Star", a 1984 track by Yngwie Malmsteen from Rising Force
"Blackstar", a 1985 song by Georgie Davis
"Black Star", a 1995 song by Radiohead from The Bends
"Black Star", a 1996 song by Carcass from Swansong
"Black Star", a 1996 song by Lustmord from Strange Attractor/Black Star
"Blackstar", a 2003 song by Yahzarah from Blackstar
"Black Star", a 2004 song by Peccatum from Lost in Reverie
"Black Star", a 2011 song by Avril Lavigne from Goodbye Lullaby
"BlackStar", a 2012 song by Carlos Jean
"Blackstar", a 2012 song by Celldweller from Wish Upon a Blackstar

Sports
Black Stars Basel, a football team based in Basel, Switzerland
Ghana national football team, nicknamed "Black Stars"

Other uses
Black Star of Africa, symbol of Africa or Ghana
Black Star (anarchist group), a Greek direct action group, also known as Mavro Asteri

See also
Black Sun (disambiguation)
Black hole
Dark Star (disambiguation)
Dark Sun (disambiguation)
Blaqstarr (born 1985), American rapper, producer and DJ
Star Black, poet, photographer and artist